Sara Zimmerman Duterte-Carpio (born May 31, 1978), commonly known as Inday Sara, is a Filipino lawyer and politician who is the 15th and current vice president of the Philippines. She is the third female vice president, the third vice president to come from Mindanao, and the youngest vice president in Philippine history. Duterte is also the secretary of education, holding the post in a concurrent capacity. A daughter of 16th president Rodrigo Duterte, she previously served as the mayor of Davao City from 2016 to 2022, and from 2010 to 2013. She was also Davao City's vice mayor from 2007 to 2010.

Born in Davao City, Duterte graduated from San Pedro College, initially aiming to pursue a medical career, before taking up a law degree from San Sebastian College – Recoletos. She was elected as Davao City's vice mayor in 2007, before eventually being elected as the city's mayor from 2010 until 2013, succeeding her father and becoming the youngest and the first female mayor of the city. After her first term ended, she took a brief hiatus, returning to politics in 2016 after being elected again as Davao City mayor and was reelected in 2019. During her second stint as mayor, she initiated the Byaheng DO30 and Peace 911 programs in the city, as well as overseeing the city government's COVID-19 pandemic response. Duterte was also an influential figure in national politics during her father's presidency, forming alliances with several political parties and playing a key role in the ouster of Pantaleon Alvarez as the Speaker of the House of Representatives in 2018.

Duterte ran for the vice presidency in 2022 under Lakas–CMD, becoming the running mate of Bongbong Marcos from the Partido Federal ng Pilipinas under the UniTeam Alliance. Their ticket won in a landslide victory, becoming the first running mate pair to win together since 2004 and the first to be elected by a majority since the establishment of the Fifth Republic in 1986. Duterte became the vice president on June 30, 2022 and was inaugurated 11 days earlier in Davao City.

Early life and education
Sara Zimmerman Duterte was born in Davao City on May 31, 1978, the second child to then-lawyer later president Rodrigo Duterte and flight attendant Elizabeth Zimmerman.

She has spoken of her "love-hate relationship" with her father when she was a student due to her disapproval for his womanizing tendencies and late night habits. Despite this, Rodrigo considered Sara to be his favorite child, and placed high value on the education she and her brothers received.

Duterte attended San Pedro College, majoring in BS Respiratory Therapy, and graduated in 1999; in her inaugural speech as mayor of Davao City, Duterte said she originally wanted to be a pediatrician instead of a politician. She later took up a law degree at the San Sebastian College – Recoletos and graduated in May 2005. In 2005, Duterte passed the Philippine Bar Examination. She then worked for a few months as a court attorney at the office of Supreme Court Associate Justice Romeo Callejo Sr.

Vice Mayor of Davao City 

Before being elected as mayor of Davao City, Duterte served as vice mayor of Davao City. She was elected in 2007, succeeding Luis Bonguyan. She served under her father, then-mayor Rodrigo Duterte, for one term until 2010. She also concurrently served as a regional officer of the National Movement of Young Legislators from 2007 to 2010.

As vice mayor, her landmark project was ‘Inday Para sa Barangay’, a whole-of-government approach servicing yearly in each of the city's barangays. It was later called the Caravan of Government Services when she transferred it to the Office of the City Mayor.

Mayor of Davao City 
In 2010, Duterte was elected mayor, becoming the first female mayor of the city, as well as being the youngest to have been elected at 32. She won over House Speaker Prospero Nograles, her father's political rival, in a lead of 200,000 votes in the 2010 elections. Nograles earlier filed a protest at the Commission on Elections in Manila questioning the results, stating that there was a conspiracy of local poll officials. Vowing to be "useful and to serve the country at all times", she assumed the post that her father Rodrigo held for over 20 years. During her first term, she also served as officer in the National Executive Board of the League of Cities Philippines from 2010 to 2013.

On December 2, 2010, President Benigno Aquino III appointed her as Chairperson of the Regional Development Council (RDC) Region XI. She was the first woman to hold the chairpersonship and the first to be appointed from the government sector since the reorganization of the council in 1986. As chairperson, she saw the growth of Davao Region’s Gross Regional Domestic Product from 3.9 percent in 2011 to 7.1 percent in 2012.

On July 1, 2011, Duterte gained national attention when she punched Abe Andres, a Davao City Regional Trial Court sheriff, over the demolition of shanties in Barangay Kapitan Tomas Monteverde Sr., Agdao, Davao City. She had earlier asked the court and the demolition team to delay the demolition but Andres refused, making her furious. On July 11, Sheriffs Confederation of the Philippines Inc. filed a complaint against Duterte in connection to the incident. On June 28, 2012, almost a year after the incident, she publicly apologized to Andres and his family.

Duterte decided not to seek re-election in 2013 to give way to her father Rodrigo. She also turned down her father's offer to run for representative of Davao City's 1st district.

Duterte ran again for the mayoralty post for Davao City in the 2016 elections and won the position, succeeding her father for the second time. She had her older brother Paolo and later Bernard Al-ag as her vice mayor. She ran for reelection in the 2019 elections and was successful.

After her father won in the 2016 presidential election, Duterte launched the "Tapang at Malasakit" movement composed of Duterte supporters and allies on October 23, 2017.

On February 23, 2018, she launched a new regional party called Hugpong ng Pagbabago (HNP). The party was later approved on July 4, 2018, ahead of the 2019 general elections. HNP also stood as an electoral alliance, fielding candidates from different parties for the senatorial election. Nine out of 13 senatorial candidates won in the election.

Following the creation of HNP, a feud began between Duterte and one of her father's allies, then House Speaker Pantaleon Alvarez, citing its formation as an example of the entrenchment of political dynasties in the country. In response, Duterte publicly berated Alvarez and alleged that he has been calling mayors in the Davao region to tag her as part of the opposition and brag about having the ability to impeach her father, all of which Alvarez denied. Duterte also remarked that "the Philippines will be a better country if he is not Speaker." Months later, Alvarez was unseated as the House Speaker in the 17th Congress, with former president and Pampanga's 2nd district representative Gloria Macapagal Arroyo taking his place. According to her father, she was behind the ousting of Alvarez as speaker, stating that "honest to God, it was Inday who maneuvered it."

Policies 
Duterte promoted the city as a tourism and investment destination, introducing the "Davao: Life is Here" tagline to market the city in 2011. During her second stint as mayor, Duterte initiated Byaheng DO30, consisting of 30 projects addressing ten priority sectors which include "education, health, poverty alleviation, infrastructure development, solid waste management and environment, agriculture, investment and tourism, traffic and transport management, disaster risk reduction and management and peace and order".

Duterte established the Peace 911 program to address the local communist rebellion through a "human-centered" approach, bringing several government services to far-flung areas. The program was first implemented in the Paquibato district before being expanded to other barangays. Her administration also established the Kean Gabriel Hotline for reporting child abuse anonymously.

As Davao City mayor, Duterte garnered an approval rating of 93% according to an independent survey by the RP-Mission and Development Foundation, exceeding her father's highest approval rating when he was mayor at 86% in 2010, and getting the highest rating throughout the country.

COVID-19 pandemic response 

In early 2020, the COVID-19 pandemic reached the city. In response, Duterte created a city task force for COVID-19 and other public health emergencies and instituted several measures to limit the spread of the disease and address the crisis. The city government cancelled several citywide events, ordered the closure of several establishments, and restricted travel and movement in the city. To aid residents affected by the restrictions, the local government provided food packs; most of the city's Bayanihan grant was spent on the purchase of food packs distributed to the city's barangays and for medical workers. Travel restrictions were eased as the number of cases lowered. The local government also established COVID-19 testing centers and isolation facilities. Her administration also oversaw the city's COVID-19 vaccination program when the national government began its vaccination program in early 2021.

Vice presidency (2022–present)

Candidacy and campaign 

Duterte was considered by many political commentators as her father's successor after her role as a powerbroker in the 2019 midterm elections. On July 9, 2021, Duterte said she was open to running for president. On September 9, she said she would not, since her father, the sitting president, would run for vice president, and they agreed that only one should run for a national position. However, he did not file his candidacy for vice president by October 2, but she did not file a candidacy for any national position, running instead for reelection as mayor of Davao City. She later withdrew her candidacy for reelection as Davao City mayor on November 9. Her brother Sebastian, incumbent vice mayor of Davao City, ran in her stead. On November 11, she resigned from Hugpong ng Pagbabago and joined Lakas–CMD in Silang, Cavite. There, she sponsored the wedding of Gianna Revilla, the daughter of party chairman and senator Bong Revilla, to Jed Patricio. Six days later, she became the chairperson of Lakas–CMD, succeeding Revilla.  On November 19, she rejoined Hugpong ng Pagbabago as its chairperson.

On November 13, she filed her candidacy for Vice President of the Philippines under Lakas–CMD for the 2022 Philippine vice presidential election. She said this was to meet her supporters halfway, who had been previously asking her to run for president. She was then adopted and endorsed by Partido Federal ng Pilipinas as their vice presidential candidate, making her the running mate of its presidential nominee, former senator Bongbong Marcos, and by the People's Reform Party.

Duterte became the vice president-elect, winning the election with 32,208,417 votes with a margin of 22 million over her closest rival, Senator Francis Pangilinan. She became the first vice president to be elected by a majority since the 1986 elections and the largest majority since 1969. She also earned the most votes for any office in a single-winner election in Philippine history. She was also the first vice president from Davao City, the youngest to become vice president at the age of 44, the third woman to hold the post after Gloria Macapagal Arroyo and Leni Robredo, the third vice president who is a child of a president after Salvador Laurel and Arroyo, the third vice president to come from Mindanao after Emmanuel Pelaez and Teofisto Guingona Jr., and the fourth Cebuano-speaking vice president overall (after Sergio Osmeña, Carlos P. Garcia, and Pelaez). She and Marcos are the first presidential ticket to win together since the 2004 elections.

On May 11, 2022, Marcos announced that Duterte agreed to join his cabinet as Secretary of Education, although she earlier expressed interest in becoming the Secretary of National Defense. According to Duterte, she chose to become the Education secretary instead to avoid "intrigues" about her loyalty to the administration. She was inaugurated in Davao City on June 19, 2022, but only officially started her term on June 30 in accordance with the Constitution. At her request, the oath-taking, which was the first in Mindanao for a vice president, was administered by Associate Justice Ramon Paul Hernando, her former professor at San Beda College of Law.

Policies 

In her first day as the vice president, Duterte established satellite offices for the Office of the Vice President in Cebu City, Dagupan, Davao City, Tacloban, Tandag, and Zamboanga City. The seat of the Office of the Vice President would then be transferred from Quezon City Reception House to Cybergate Plaza in Mandaluyong, which is closer to the headquarters of the Department of Education in Pasig where she also holds office as its secretary. Duterte plans to establish a permanent office for the position.

As concurrent Education Secretary, Duterte was responsible for planning further the transition to the resumption of mandatory face-to-face classes at all basic education schools in the Philippines, which was put on hold since 2020 due to the risks brought out by the COVID-19 pandemic, for the school year 2022–2023. She issued her first department order, the Department Order No. 034 dated July 11, 2022, wherein schools may either opt for five-day in-person classes or blended modality from the opening of classes on August 22 to October 31 before shifting to mandatory in-person classes observing physical distancing when necessary by November 2 onwards. She also declared that school uniforms and vaccination among students would be optional for the upcoming school year. She also mulled institutionalizing blended learning only in select schools and areas with special circumstances, including schools with possibly unrepaired or unfinished buildings. Earlier, before taking office, Duterte also called the reinstatement of the mandatory Reserve Officers’ Training Corps (ROTC), which would later gain more support especially from legislators and government officials.

On August 3, 2022, Duterte, alongside the Department of Transportation, launched the Libreng Sakay Program of the Office of the Vice President, providing free rides as an effort to decongest the roads during peak hours. It initially launched five buses bestowed by the department, deploying two in Metro Manila (plying the EDSA Carousel route) and one each in Bacolod, Cebu (plying Mandaue, Lapu-Lapu City, and Cebu City), and Davao City.

Personal life

Duterte has been married since October 27, 2007, to fellow lawyer Manases "Mans" R. Carpio, whom she met while she was attending San Beda University. They have three children. Manases, a nephew of Ombudsman Conchita Carpio-Morales and Supreme Court Senior Associate Justice Antonio Carpio, is a legal counsel for Lapanday Foods Corporation.

Duterte also hosted television programs such as Una Ka BAI and Byaheng DO30 on GMA Davao, the local station of GMA Network. The latter also expanded its airing across Mindanao via GMA Regional TV and internationally via GMA News TV International.

During her political hiatus from 2013 to 2016, Duterte devoted her time as one of the partner lawyers of Carpio & Duterte Lawyers. Planning to join the judiciary, she also passed the Pre-Judicature Program of the Philippine Judicial Academy. Duterte was elected as one of the governors of the Philippine Red Cross in 2014. Duterte is a reserve officer in the Armed Forces of the Philippines with the rank of colonel, being confirmed on March 11, 2020.

In October 2015, to convince her father to run for president in the 2016 Philippine presidential elections despite his reluctance due to lack of campaign funds and political machinery, she shaved her head. On April 18, 2016, in connection with the rape remark made by her father Rodrigo on one of his presidential candidacy campaigns, Duterte took to her Instagram account to admit that she was once a rape victim. However, Rodrigo Duterte dismissed his daughter's admission and referred to her as a "drama queen".

On March 10, 2022, she told supporters at a meet-and-greet that she was part of the LGBT community, with her gender expression being male and sex being female. Duterte's statement was met with some skepticism by local LGBT activist groups.

See also 

 Hoya indaysarae, a species named after her

Notes

References

External links

|-

|-

|-

|-

|-

|-

|-

1978 births
Living people
21st-century Filipino women politicians
21st-century Filipino politicians
Bongbong Marcos administration cabinet members
Candidates in the 2022 Philippine vice-presidential election
Children of presidents of the Philippines
Davao City
Sara Duterte
Filipino people of American-Jewish descent
Filipino people of German-Jewish descent
Filipino television personalities
Filipino women lawyers
Lakas–CMD politicians
Filipino LGBT politicians
Mayors of Davao City
Mayors of places in Davao del Sur
People from Davao City
Vice presidents of the Philippines
Women mayors of places in the Philippines
Women vice presidents
Women members of the Cabinet of the Philippines